Euproctis latifascia is a moth of the family Erebidae first described by Francis Walker in 1855. It is found in India, Sri Lanka and Taiwan.

The caterpillar is an important pest attacking old leaves of tea.

Subspecies
Two subspecies are recognized including the nominate.
Euproctis latifascia latifascia Walker, 1855
Euproctis latifascia suisharyonis Strand, 1914

References

External links
Observations on the bionomics of Euproctis latifascia Walker
Exploring the biocontrol potential of naturally occurring bacterial and viral entomopathogens of defoliating lepidopteran pests of tea plantations

Moths of Asia
Moths described in 1855